Segetibacter is a genus of bacteria from the family of Chitinophagaceae.

References

Chitinophagia
Bacteria genera
Taxa described in 2007